Domenico Gambino (17 May 1890 – 17 April 1968) was an Italian actor, screenwriter and film director.

Gambino played Saetta, one of the rival strongman heroes to Maciste. Saetta had his own series of films during the early 1920s. He directed the 1931 German film A Storm Over Zakopane.

Selected filmography

Actor 
 Cabiria (1914)
 Saetta Saves the Queen (1920)
 Chief Saetta (1924)
 Emperor Maciste (1924)
 Saetta Learns to Live (1924)
 Thieves (1928)
 I Lost My Heart on a Bus (1929)
 A Storm Over Zakopane (1931)
 All is at Stake (1932)
 His Young Wife (1945)

Director 
 The Last Performance of the Circus Wolfson (1928)
 Affair at the Grand Hotel (1929)
 A Storm Over Zakopane (1931)

Screenwriter
 Tragic Serenade (1951)

References

Bibliography 
 Munich, Adrienne. Fashion in Film. Indiana University Press, 2011.
 Skaff, Sheila. The Law of the Looking Glass: Cinema in Poland, 1896-1939. Ohio University Press, 2008.

External links 
 
 

1890 births
1968 deaths
Italian male film actors
Italian male silent film actors
Italian film directors
20th-century Italian screenwriters
Italian male screenwriters
Film people from Turin
20th-century Italian male actors
Actors from Turin
20th-century Italian male writers